Swan Hills is a town in northern Alberta, Canada. The town is at the junction of Highway 32 and Grizzly Trail, and is surrounded by Big Lakes County.

It is the nearest major settlement to the geographic centre of the province. The site is protected by the Centre of Alberta Natural Area, a 3-kilometre hike from Highway 33.

History 
Initially a base camp for workers in the Swan Hills oilfield, accommodations and facilities were moved from a nearby site and jointly developed in the present location by the government of Alberta and oil companies between 1959-1961. Casually nicknamed 'Oil Hills', the town's official name was taken from the area of densely forested uplands in which it is located, although 'Chalmers' was also considered, after T.W. Chalmers, who had surveyed and cut the Klondike Trail through the area.

The New Town of Swan Hills was incorporated on September 1, 1959 and R.L. Maxfield was appointed as Development Officer and Secretary Treasurer. Twenty-four parcels of industrial land were sold at the first land auction in November 1959. The first all-weather road into the area was completed in 1960, replacing the treacherous forestry road connecting Swan Hills to Fort Assiniboine; the Swan Hills Post Office was opened the same year. The New Town of Swan Hills was officially opened by Premier Ernest Manning in June 1962.

Two teachers provided instruction for forty students in the first two-room school, which was quickly replaced by a seven-room building due to the rapidly increasing population as oil field workers began to relocate their families to the town. Two mobile radio units provided communications and an isolated diesel generating plant provided power until Alberta Government Telephones installed service and Canadian Utilities Ltd. completed an  transmission line in 1960. In November 1965, Swan Hills became the most northerly town in Alberta to be served with natural gas by Northwestern Utilities.

Swan Hills' status was changed when it was formally incorporated as a town on January 1, 1967 making it the first town incorporated during Canada's centennial year. Tom Parkinson was elected the first mayor, serving in the position until 1971.

Situated within dense boreal forest, Swan Hills has been evacuated at least five times as wildfires threatened the town: 1972, 1981 and 1983, and twice in May 1998, when the Virginia Hills Fire, came close. The town has since implemented a FireSmart program, reducing fire fuel within and around the urban perimeter.

Demographics 

Economy 

The primary industry in Swan Hills is oil and gas, although the Swan Hills Treatment Centre, north of the town, is also a local employer.  It is also a service centre for the logging industry.

Attractions 

Swan Hills' wilderness setting makes it a popular year-round destination for nature enthusiasts and outdoor sports including camping, hunting, fishing, trapping and ATV riding.

Annual Events 
 Snowmobiling: Swan Hills is one of the three points of The Golden Triangle, a groomed  snowmobile trail. A large number of people visit town for the annual Swan Hills Snow Goers snowmobile rally.
 Motocross: The Swan Hills Dirt riders host an annual motocross meet. 
 Target Shooting: Swan Hills Outdoor Recreation Club hosts an annual skeet-shooting competition at the gun range 
 Curling: In the winter there are several annual bonspiels hosted by the Swan Hills Curling Cub. 
 Hockey: In the winter there are several tournaments hosted by Swan Hills Minor Hockey.

Education 
Kindergarten to Grade 12 students are served by Swan Hills School , in the Pembina Hills Public Schools district.

Health Services 
Emergency and other medical services are provided at the Swan Hills Healthcare Centre. Family and community social programs and services are available through FCSS (Family & Community Support Services) 780-333-4119

Government 
Local affairs in Swan Hills are managed by a Mayor and town council under Alberta Municipal Affairs. Swan Hills is located in the provincial riding of Barrhead-Morinville-Westlock. Federally, the town is in the constituency of Peace River-Westlock.

Notable people 
Evan Williams, actor and musician
Leland Irving, professional hockey player

Nearby 
 Goose Mountain Ecological Reserve
 E.S. Huestis Demonstration Forest
 Trapper Lea's Cabin
 Centre of Alberta Natural Area
 Swan Hills Airport

See also 
List of communities in Alberta
List of towns in Alberta

References

External links 

1959 establishments in Alberta
Big Lakes County
Towns in Alberta
Former new towns in Alberta